Rock Dell is an unincorporated community in Rock Dell Township, Olmsted County, Minnesota, United States.  The community is located near the junction of Olmsted County Roads 3, 26, and 126.  The South Fork of the Zumbro River flows through the community.  Nearby places include Byron, Hayfield, Stewartville, and Rochester.

References

Unincorporated communities in Olmsted County, Minnesota
Unincorporated communities in Minnesota